Ola Andersson (born 24 November 1962) is a retired Swedish ice hockey player. Andersson was part of the Djurgården Swedish champions' team of 1989. Andersson made 50 Elitserien appearances for Djurgården.

References

External links

1962 births
Djurgårdens IF Hockey players
Living people
Södertälje SK players
Swedish ice hockey coaches
Swedish ice hockey forwards